The Definitive Greatest Hits: 'Til the Last Shot's Fired is the twelfth album, and the third compilation album from American country music artist Trace Adkins. It was released on October 12, 2010, through Capitol Nashville. The album includes all of his Top 40 hits for the label except "I'm Gonna Love You Anyway" (from the album More…), as well as the non-singles "Dangerous Man" and "'Til the Last Shot's Fired". These cuts were previously found on the albums Dangerous Man and X, respectively.

Critical reception
Stephen Thomas Erlewine of Allmusic gave the album four stars out of five, calling it "an overview of his peak that is indeed definitive."

Track listing

Charts

Weekly charts

Year-end charts

References

2010 greatest hits albums
Trace Adkins albums
Capitol Records compilation albums